Alexander Fadeyev may refer to:

Alexander Fadeyev (writer) (1901–1956), Soviet writer
Alexandre Fadeev (born 1964), Soviet/Russian figure skater

See also
 Fadeyev, a surname